Together Brothers is a 1974 American film directed by William A. Graham and starring Ahmad Nurradin and Anthony Wilson. The film is about a gang of street youths who try to expose a cop killer before he gets to a child who witnessed the murder.

Plot

In one of the poorer neighborhoods of Galveston, Texas, a popular and respected black police officer nicknamed Mr. Kool (Ed Bernard) dies in a hail of bullets, and the only witness to the crime is 5-year-old Tommy (Anthony Wilson). The killer, face unseen, reluctantly attempts to shoot the boy, but the gun is empty. Tommy is struck mute by shock and the killer begins stalking him. However, Tommy's older brother H.J. (Ahmad Nurradin) is the leader of a small local gang of Black youths called "Brothers United." The gang members make it their mission to protect Tommy while simultaneously working to bring Mr. Kool's unknown killer to justice.

Cast
 Ahmad Nurradin as H.J.
 Anthony Wilson as Tommy
 Nelson Sims as A.P.
 Kenneth Bell as "Mau-Mau"
 Owen Pace as "Monk"
 Kim Dorsey as "Gri-Gri"
 Ed Bernard as Mr. Kool
 Lincoln Kilpatrick as Billy Most
 Glynn Turman as Dr. Johnson
 Richard Yniguez as Vega

Sampling
The main title theme to the movie by Barry White was sampled by Florida dance group Quad City DJ's for their 1996 hit single "C'mon N' Ride It (The Train)". It has since been sampled in eight other songs by artists like Luther Campbell, Baha Men, and DJ Drama.

See also
 List of American films of 1974
 List of hood films

References

External links

1974 films
Blaxploitation films
Films set in Texas
Films shot in Texas
1974 drama films
Transgender-related films
Films directed by William Graham (director)
1970s English-language films
American exploitation films
American LGBT-related films
American drama films
1970s American films